Wedder Law is a hill in the Lowther Hills range, part of the Southern Uplands of Scotland. With a flat, featureless summit, it is normally ascended as part of a round of the neighbouring hills.

References

Mountains and hills of the Southern Uplands
Mountains and hills of Dumfries and Galloway
Donald mountains